Stephen James Crowther (born January 1957) is a former acting leader of the UK Independence Party (UKIP). On 9 June 2017, he succeeded Paul Nuttall who stepped down after the party failed to win any seats in the 2017 UK general election.

Crowther had previously been UKIP party chairman, a position from which he resigned in July 2016 a few weeks after the EU referendum. In 2014, as part of UKIP's efforts to avoid growing embarrassment from online racist comments by members, he advised members not to join Facebook or Twitter.

In late 2015, he was called the "absentee Chairman" by Matthew Goodwin in his sequel book on the history of UKIP.

Crowther has been the UKIP candidate for North Devon three times. In the 2017 general election he polled the second-fewest votes in the constituency. He is a retired trade journalist and writer who ran an advertising agency in London. Considered as an interim leader of UKIP, Crowther said he would launch the process for the election of a more permanent party leader.

He resigned from UKIP in December 2018.

Elections contested
UK Parliament elections

References

|-

1957 births
Living people
Leaders of the UK Independence Party
UK Independence Party parliamentary candidates